Stanley Briggs (7 February 1872 – 1931) was an English footballer who played for Folkestone, Tottenham Hotspur and Woolwich Arsenal.

Career
Briggs first joined Tottenham in 1890, which was previously known as Hermitage. In October 1893 he joined Woolwich Arsenal and was there less than three months playing only two games. His first and debut match was against Rotherham Town, the other game was against Burton Swifts which ended 6–2. In 1895 when Tottenham moved to turn professional the club held a meeting at The Eagle pub in which Briggs refused to attend. This left Briggs the only amateur in the team when the rest turned professional. 
He was considered one of the best players in the team at the time.

After his football career, Briggs emigrated to Canada and died while playing tennis.

Appearances
Source:
 Southern League: 7 apps, 1 goal
 FA Cup: 10 apps
 Other: 95 app, 10 goals
 Total: 112 apps, 11 goals

References

External links
 https://blog.woolwicharsenal.co.uk/archives/13538
 https://claptonfootballclub.wordpress.com/2015/10/29/stanley-briggs/

1872 births
1931 deaths
Folkestone F.C. players
Hermitage F.C. players
Tottenham Hotspur F.C. players
Woolwich Arsenal F.C. players
Clapton F.C. players
Shepherd's Bush F.C. players
English footballers
Association footballers not categorized by position